Ethy Mbhalati (born 18 November 1981) is a South African first-class cricketer. He was included in the Easterns cricket team squad for the 2015 Africa T20 Cup. In August 2016, he was given a ten-year ban by Cricket South Africa for his involvement in match fixing during the 2015–16 Ram Slam T20 Challenge tournament.

References

External links
 

1981 births
Living people
South African cricketers
Easterns cricketers
People from Phalaborwa
Cricketers banned for corruption
Sportspeople from Limpopo